The 2012–13 Eastern Counties Football League season (known as the 2012–13 Thurlow Nunn Eastern Counties Football League for sponsorship reasons) was the 71st in the history of Eastern Counties Football League a football competition in England.

Dereham Town were crowned champions on 27 April 2013 after a 5–0 win over FC Clacton.

Premier Division

The Premier Division featured 18 clubs which competed in the division last season, along with two new clubs, promoted from Division One:
Godmanchester Rovers
Thetford Town

For this season only, the FA were to promote a second club from two of the following six Step 5 leagues: Combined Counties League, Eastern Counties League, Essex Senior League, Kent League, Spartan South Midlands League and the Sussex County League. This was to fulfil the expansion of the Isthmian League Divisions One North and South from 22 to 24 clubs each.  The two clubs were to be promoted on a points per game basis, and the two runners-up with the best PPG were VCD Athletic (Kent Football League) and Guernsey (Combined Counties League). Three others – Aylesbury United (Spartan South Midlands League), Redhill (Sussex County League) and Barkingside (Essex Senior League) – were also confirmed as promoted by the FA on 17 May, due to resignations and non-promotions elsewhere.
From this league, only Brantham Athletic, Dereham Town, Haverhill Rovers, Stanway Rovers and Wisbech Town applied for promotion. Brantham later withdrew their application, and Wisbech withdrew theirs after securing the runners-up position at the end of the season.

League table

Results

Division One

Division One featured 14 clubs which competed in the division last season, along with four new clubs:
Newmarket Town, relegated from the Premier Division
Great Yarmouth Town, relegated from Premier Division
Braintree Town reserves
Saffron Walden Town, which skipped the previous season

Newmarket Town achieved promotion to the Premier Division on the 13 April 2013. Cambridge University Press also achieved enough points to secure promotion on April 13, 2013 but will not be promoted as they withdrew from the league on April 6, 2013.

League table

Results

References

External links
 Eastern Counties Football League

2012-13
9